The Caterpillar 930G is a hydraulic front end loader manufactured by Caterpillar Inc. The 930G, with  of net flywheel power at 2300 rpm, it is classified as a small wheeled loader in the line of Caterpillar's excavators.  The MSRP of a standard 930G is $145,400.

Specifications

Engine
Net Flywheel Power: 149 hp (110 kW)
Net Power (ISO 9249)(1997): 150 hp (111 kW)
Net Power (SAE J1349): 149 hp (110 kW)
Net Power (EEC 80/1269): 150 hp (111 kW)

Weights
Operating Weight: 28,725 lb (13,029 kg)
Maximum Weight: 29,044 lb (13,174 kg)
Optional Counterweight: 470 kg (1040 lb)

Attachments and work tools

Angle blades
Angle broom
High dump and rollout buckets
Loader rakes
Log and lumber forks
Material handling buckets
Multi-purpose buckets
Pallet forks
Pickup broom
Reversible plows
Side dump buckets
Top clamp buckets
Woodchip buckets

References

930G
Construction equipment